Ubaldo Gandolfi (1728–1781) was an Italian painter of the late-Baroque period, mainly active in and near Bologna.

Biography
He was born in San Matteo della Decima and enrolled by the age of 17 at the Clementine Academy, where he apprenticed with Ercole Graziani the Younger, Felice Torelli, and Ercole Lelli. He was from a large family of prolific artists, including his sons Giovanni Battista and Ubaldo Lorenzo, as well as his brother Gaetano and nephews Mauro, Democrito (who became a pupil of Antonio Canova), and niece Clementina. Together, they are considered among the last representatives of the grand manner of painting characteristic of the Bolognese school, that had risen to prominence nearly two centuries earlier with the Carracci.

Gandolfi's work ranges from Baroque to Neoclassic styles, and specifically recalls the style of Ludovico Carracci.  He completed, in 1770–75, a series of canvases on mythological narratives for the Palazzo Marescalchi in Bologna (two are now in Museum of North Carolina ). A series of seven saints painted by Gandolfi is on display at the Quadreria of the Palazzo Rossi Poggi Marsili in Bologna. He died in Ravenna in 1781. Among his pupils was Giuseppe Grimanti, Giovanni Lipparini (il Rosolino), and Nicola Levoli.

References

 Cazort, Mimi, Bella Pittura: The Art of the Gandolfi, Ottawa, National Gallery of Canada, 1993.,
 Cazort, Mimi, The Art of Embellishment: Drawings and Paintings by Gaetano and Mauro Gandolfi for a Festive Carriage, in Record of The Art Museum, Princeton University, Volume 52, Number 2, 1993.
 Rosasco, Betsy, Drawings by the Gandolfi Family and Their Followers in The Art Museum: A Checklist, in Record of The Art Museum, Princeton University, Volume 52, Number 2, 1993.
 Vicenza, Neri Pozza, I Gandolfi: Ubaldo, Gaetano, Mauro, disegni e dipinti, Neri Pozza Editore, 1987.

External links
 Exhibition of Gaetano and Ubaldo Gandolfi's work in 2002.
 Bacchus and Ariadne

Gallery

Further reading

1728 births
1781 deaths
18th-century Italian painters
Italian male painters
Painters from Bologna
Italian Baroque painters
Accademia di Belle Arti di Bologna alumni
People from the Province of Bologna
18th-century Italian male artists